Parasurama Kalpasutra (Paraśurāma Kalpasūtra | Sanskrit: परशुरामकल्पसूत्रम्), is a Shakta Agama, Hindu text on Shri Vidya practices as per Kaula tradition and is said to be authored by Parasurama, the fifth avatar of Lord Vishnu and a disciple of Guru Dattatreya. It is a sacred text for the Shri Vidya worshippers of Goddess Lalita Devi, who is considered to be a manifestation of the Divine Mother (Shakti), and the text is therefore used in the worship of Ganesha, Bala Tripurasundari, Raja Shyamala, Varahi as well. This text has its origins in the Dattatreya Samhita and is compiled by Sumedha, a disciple of Guru Dattatreya.

Key concepts 

Among the Agamas (manuals on rituals and practices), some are Tantras. Tantra is principally for 'upasana', inner discipline and are epitomes of knowledge. Tantras that are essentially esoteric deal with inner practices by adoration of the symbolic image, the yantra, and the mantra for awakening the Kundalini shakti.

Parasurama composed the Kalpasutra, emphasizing the importance of ‘Urdhvamnaya’ (the tradition of the above) where he has shown the importance of the esoteric rituals through proper contraction of external rituals like japa, puja, mudras, pranayama, etc.  and revealed the secrets of the symbols and the mantras for awakening the inner senses and Kundalini.

A study of this Parasurama kalpasutra also shows the scheme and essence of the Tantra. It dispels the misunderstanding regarding the Tantra practices.

Structure of the text

Parasurama Kalpasutra has its origins in the 'Dattatreya Samhita' which consisted of ten thousand suktas. On instructions from Guru Dattatreya, Parasurama condensed the Samhita to six thousand suktas in fifty parts. The present compact work available to us is of just 84 sutras and is arranged in 10 parts. It was compiled by Sumedha, who was a disciple of Parashurama.

The Kalpasutra consists of:
 1  Deeksha Vidhi
 2  Gana Nayaka Padhati
 3  Srikramam
 4  Lalita Kramam
 5  Navavarana Pooja
 6  Shyama Kramam
 7  Varahi Kramam
 8  Para Kramam
 9  Homa vidhana
 10 Sarva Sadharana Kramam

Sources
Key concepts and practices as described in Parasurama Kalpasutra are also written in "Nityotsava Nibandaha", a book compiled by Umānandanātha, a disciple of the famous Śrī Vidyā upasaka Bhāskararāya (Bhāsurānandanātha).

Schools

The principal practices of Sri Vidya Sadhana as laid down in the Parashurama Kalpasutra are brought into light by late Sri Amritananda Natha Saraswati of Devipuram and his disciple Guru Karunamaya in their Guru Parampara (tradition).

See also
 Devi Mahatmya
 Mantra
 Tripura Sundari
 Ganesha
 Bala Tripurasundari
 Varahi
 Shri Vidya
 Shri Yantra

References

External links

 Tripura Sundari
 Shaktism
 Hindu texts
 Hindu philosophy
 Religious texts
 Sanskrit texts